Oceanic Linguistics is a biannual peer-reviewed academic journal covering research on the indigenous languages of the Oceanic area and parts of Southeast Asia, including the indigenous Australian languages, the Papuan languages of New Guinea, and the languages of the Austronesian (or Malayo-Polynesian) family. Monographs on the same languages are published as Oceanic Linguistics Special Publications.

History
The journal was established in 1962 by George W. Grace (Southern Illinois University, later University of Hawaii). It has been published by the University of Hawaii Press since 1966 (vol. 5). In 1992, the editorship passed to Byron W. Bender (University of Hawaii) and in 2007 it passed to John Lynch (University of the South Pacific). In 2019, he was succeeded by Daniel Kaufman, Yuko Otsuka, and Antoinette Schapper.

The journal's first electronic edition appeared in 2000 on Project MUSE. Back volumes up to three years behind the current volumes of both the journal and the monograph series are available on JSTOR.

References

External links

Oceanic Linguistics Special Publications

English-language journals
Publications established in 1962
University of Hawaiʻi Press academic journals
Linguistics journals
Biannual journals
Oceania studies journals
1962 establishments in Illinois